Dan Hill (born 15 July 2002) is a professional rugby league footballer who plays as a  or er  for St Helens in the Betfred Super League.

He previously played for the Widnes Vikings in the Betfred Championship.

Hill made his first team début for Saints in April 2022 against the Castleford Tigers.

References

External links
St Helens profile
Saints Heritage Society profile
SL profile

2002 births
Living people
English rugby league players
Rugby league players from Warrington
Rugby league centres
Rugby league fullbacks
Rugby league wingers
St Helens R.F.C. players
Widnes Vikings players